The United Kingdom has had several coalition governments throughout its history:
 Aberdeen ministry, the British government under Lord Aberdeen (1852–1855)
 Asquith coalition ministry, the British government under H. H. Asquith (1915–1916)
 Lloyd George ministry, the British government under David Lloyd George (1916–1922)
 War ministry, the British government during the Second World War
Chamberlain war ministry, the British government under Neville Chamberlain (1939–1940)
Churchill war ministry, the British government under Winston Churchill (1940–1945)
 Cameron–Clegg coalition, the British government under David Cameron and Nick Clegg (2010–2015)

See also
 Broad Bottom ministry, a British coalition government dominated by the Pelham brothers (1744–1754)
 Fox–North coalition, the British government dominated by Charles James Fox and Lord North (1783)
 Godolphin–Marlborough ministry, a British coalition government dominated by Lord Godolphin and the Duke of Marlborough (1702–1707)
 National Government (United Kingdom), multiple cross-party British ministries
 Unionist ministry (disambiguation)